John Paine Cushman (March 8, 1784 Plainfield, Windham County, Connecticut – September 16, 1848 Troy, Rensselaer County, New York) was an American lawyer and politician from New York.

Early life 
Cushman attended the common schools and Plainfield Academy, and graduated from Yale College in 1807. Then he studied law at the Litchfield Law School, was admitted to the bar in 1809, and commenced practice in Troy, New York.

Career
In 1817, Cushman was elected as a Federalist to the 15th United States Congress with 54.98% of the popular vote, topping the incumbent Hosea Moffitt, a fellow Federalist. After holding office from March 4, 1817, to March 3, 1819, Cushman resumed the practice of law.

He was a regent of the University of the State of New York from April 1830 until April 1834, when he resigned. He was a trustee of Union College from 1833 until his death.  He was Recorder of Troy from 1834 to 1838, and Judge of the Third Circuit from 1838 to 1844.

Personal life
While in law school he met and married Maria Jones Tallmadge (1790–1878), the daughter of Benjamin Tallmadge, a Revolutionary War officer who was the leader of the Culper Ring who later became a U.S. Representative, and sister of Frederick A. Tallmadge. Together, they had:
Julia Paine Cushman (b. 1822), who married Amos Henry Farnsworth (b. 1825) in 1850.
Tallmadge Cushman
Edward Cushman
Harriet Delafield Cushman (1825-1897), who married Col. George Thatcher Balch (1828–1894).
Mary Floyd Cushman (1827–1916), who married Edward C. Williams (1820–1913)
John Paine Cushman, Jr. (1830–1901), a Presbyterian minister, who married H. Caroline Maltby in 1860.

After his death on September 16, 1848, he was buried at the Oakwood Cemetery in Troy, New York.

References

External links 

1784 births
1848 deaths
Yale College alumni
Litchfield Law School alumni
Politicians from Troy, New York
New York (state) state court judges
People from Plainfield, Connecticut
Federalist Party members of the United States House of Representatives from New York (state)
Burials in New York (state)
19th-century American politicians
Burials at Oakwood Cemetery (Troy, New York)
19th-century American judges